Aminabad is a union territory of Char Fasson Upazila in Bhola district in Bangladesh.

Area
The area of Aminabad Union is 6,145 acres.

Administrative Structure
Aminabad Union is a union of Char Fasson Upazila. Administrative activities of this union are under Char Fasson police Station. It is part of Bhola-4 constituency 118 of the National Assembly.

Population Data
According to the 2011 census, the total population of Aminabad Union is 17,461 Of these, 8,532 are males and 8,971 are females. The total number of families is 3902.

Education
According to the 2011 census, Char Madraj Union has an average literacy rate of 64.9%

Reference

See also
 Unions of Bangladesh

Unions of Char Fasson Upazila 
Unions of Bhola District 
Char Fasson Upazila